Category 2 or Category II may refer to:

 Category 2 cable, a grade of unshielded twisted pair cabling
 Category 2 tropical cyclone, on any of the Tropical cyclone scales
 Category 2 pandemic, on the Pandemic Severity Index, an American influenza pandemic with a case-fatality ratio between 0.1% and 0.5%
 Category 2 winter storm, on the Northeast Snowfall Impact Scale and the Regional Snowfall Index
 Any of several winter storms listed at list of Northeast Snowfall Impact Scale winter storms
 Category II New Testament manuscripts – Egyptian
 Category II measurement – performed on circuits directly connected to the low voltage installation
 Category-II Miniratna public sector undertakings (India)
 Category II protected area (IUCN) – National Park
 Category 02 non-silicate mineral – Sulfides, Sulfosalts, Sulfarsenates, Sulfantimonates, Selenides, Tellurides

See also 
 Class 2 (disambiguation) – class/category equivalence (for labeling)
 Type 2 (disambiguation) – type/category equivalence (for labeling)
 Group 2 (disambiguation) – group/category equivalence (for labeling)